The 2023 Nigerian Senate elections in Niger State will be held on 25 February 2023, to elect the 3 federal Senators from Niger State, one from each of the state's three senatorial districts. The elections will coincide with the 2023 presidential election, as well as other elections to the Senate and elections to the House of Representatives; with state elections being held two weeks later. Primaries were held between 4 April and 9 June 2022.

Background
In terms of the previous Senate elections, only one of the three incumbent senators were returned as Aliyu Sabi Abdullahi (APC-North) (APC-West) were re-elected while David Umaru (APC-East) and Sani Mohammed (APC-South) lost renomination. In the North district, Abdullahi was re-elected with 65% of the vote; in the open East seat, Sani Musa held the seat for the APC with 65% of the vote while as Muhammad Bima Enagi held the South seat for the APC with 61%. These results were a part of the continuation of the Niger APC's dominance as most House of Representatives seats were won by the party, it won a majority in the House of Assembly, and Buhari won the state in the presidential election.

Overview

Summary

Niger East 

The Niger East Senatorial District covers the local government areas of Bosso, Chanchaga, Gurara, Munya, Paikoro, Rafi, Shiroro, Suleja, and Tafa. Incumbent Sani Musa (APC), who was elected with 65.1% of the vote in 2019, is seeking re-election.

General election

Results

Niger North 

The Niger North Senatorial District covers the local government areas of Agwara, Borgu, Kontagora, Magama, Mariga, Mashegu, Rijau, and Wushishi. Incumbent Aliyu Sabi Abdullahi (APC), who was elected with 65.2% of the vote in 2019, sought re-election but lost renomination.

General election

Results

Niger South 

The Niger South Senatorial District covers the local government areas of Agaie, Bida, Edati, Gbako, Katcha, Lapai, Lavun, and Mokwa. Incumbent Muhammad Bima Enagi (APC), who was elected with 61.6% of the vote in 2019, is seeking re-election.

General election

Results

See also 
 2023 Nigerian Senate election
 2023 Nigerian elections
 2023 Niger State elections

References 

Niger State senatorial elections
2023 Niger State elections
Niger State Senate elections